This is a list of the Iran national football team results from 2020 to present.

2020
Friendly

Friendly

2021
Friendly

2022 FIFA World Cup Qualifier – Second Round

2022 FIFA World Cup Qualifier – Second Round

2022 FIFA World Cup Qualifier – Second Round

2022 FIFA World Cup Qualifier – Second Round

2022 FIFA World Cup Qualifier – Third Round

2022 FIFA World Cup Qualifier – Third Round

2022 FIFA World Cup Qualifier – Third Round

2022 FIFA World Cup Qualifier – Third Round

2022 FIFA World Cup Qualifier – Third Round

2022 FIFA World Cup Qualifier – Third Round

2022
2022 FIFA World Cup Qualifier – Third Round

2022 FIFA World Cup Qualifier – Third Round

2022 FIFA World Cup Qualifier – Third Round

2022 FIFA World Cup Qualifier – Third Round

Friendly

Friendly

Friendly

Friendly

2022 FIFA World Cup – Preliminary Round

2022 FIFA World Cup – Preliminary Round

2022 FIFA World Cup – Preliminary Round

Statistics

Results by year

Managers

Opponents

References

External links

 Results national-football-teams.com
 www.teammelli.com
 FIFA

2020
2019–20 in Iranian football
2020–21 in Iranian football
2020s in Iran